Silverton is a large housing scheme in Dumbarton East, Scotland, located between Dumbarton Rock and Dumbuck Hill and Round Riding Road to the north. It derives its name from the farm upon which it is now located.

It is predominantly a residential area, with both public and private housing stock. Due to its relatively flat geography, the public sector housing was often let to the elderly and infirm of Dumbarton, but now houses a mix of those and commuters to the largest city in Scotland, Glasgow, not far from the town. Dumbarton Academy, the nondenominal public secondary school (though predominantly Protestant) and St. Patrick's Primary School are situated in Silverton, as is the Brock Bowling Club. Dumbarton East railway station is nearby.

There are three newsagent Shops (one of them has a post office), and a Fish & Chip and Pizzeria take-away shop. There is also a swing park in an area known as The Dam.

External links
Brock Bowling Club (Dumbarton)

Dumbarton